Stefano Tatai (born Rome, 23 March 1938, died Tenerife 29 May 2017) was an Italian chess master. He was of Hungarian descent. He was awarded the Italian national master title in 1958, and the International Master title in 1966. He was twelve times Italian champion, in 1962, 1965, 1967, 1970, 1974, 1977, 1979, 1983, 1985, 1990, 1991 and 1994.

During the 1950s, he coached composer Ennio Morricone, who became a strong chess player.

Bibliography

References

External links

1938 births
2017 deaths
Italian chess players
Chess International Masters
Chess Olympiad competitors